Joanna Sotomura was born in Honolulu, Hawaii, United States. She is best known for her work on the Emmy Award-winning Emma Approved (2013), Madison County (2011) and Everything Before Us (2015).

Education 
She graduated from Loyola Marymount University in Los Angeles, California, with a Bachelor of Fine Arts degree in Theatre Arts in 2009.

Filmography

Films (Feature-length and short)

TV series / web series

Voice-over work 
Voiced Everlyn 'Boats' Sotomura in Call of Duty: Infinite Warfare - released 4 November 2016.

References

External links
 

1985 births
American film actresses
American television actresses
American actresses of Japanese descent
American film actors of Asian descent
Actresses from Honolulu
Living people
Loyola Marymount University alumni
21st-century American women